Leati Sika Amituana'i Anoa'i (born April 5, 1945), better known as Sika Anoa'i or simply Sika, is an American Samoan retired professional wrestler. He is best known as one-half of the tag team The Wild Samoans with his brother Afa. Championships held by Anoa'i over the course of his career include the WWF World Tag Team Championship. He was inducted into the WWE Hall of Fame in 2007 and the Professional Wrestling Hall of Fame in 2012. He is a member of the Anoa'i family and the father of professional wrestlers Rosey and Roman Reigns.

Early life
Anoa'i was born in the village of Leone on the island of Tutuila in American Samoa on April 5, 1945; one of thirteen children born to Amituana and Tovale Anoa'i. In 1959, at the age of 14, Anoa'i moved with his family to San Francisco, California in the United States. Shortly after the move, Anoa'i enlisted in the United States Merchant Marine, working on ships sailing to the Philippines and Japan. Anoa'i left the Merchant Marine in 1969, working as a stevedore before deciding to become a professional wrestler like his older brother Afa.

Professional wrestling career

Early career (1973–1980)
Anoa'i was trained as a wrestler by his brother Afa and Kurt Von Steiger, debuting in 1973 in Stampede Wrestling as "Sika". Calling themselves "The Wild Samoans", the brothers and gained notoriety due to their large, wild afros, sarongs, and habit of wrestling barefoot and eating raw fish in the ring. Throughout the 1970s, The Wild Samoans appeared with promotions including Big Time Wrestling, the Continental Wrestling Association, Gulf Coast Championship Wrestling, NWA All-Star Wrestling, NWA Mid-America, Stampede Wrestling, and the World Wrestling Council, winning multiple tag team championships.

World Wrestling Federation (1980)
In January 1980, The Wild Samoans debuted in the World Wrestling Federation with Lou Albano as their manager, quickly establishing themselves as a force in the tag team division through a series of decisive victories. In addition to competing in the tag division, the brothers wrestled as singles, with Anoa'i unsuccessfully challenging Bob Backlund for the WWF Championship in March 1980.

On April 12, 1980, The Wild Samoans defeated Ivan Putski and Tito Santana to win the WWF World Tag Team Championship. Their reign lasted until August 9, 1980, when they lost to Backlund and Pedro Morales at Showdown at Shea. As Backlund was the then-WWF Champion, he and Morales were forced to vacate the championship, and The Wild Samoans regained the championship on the September 9, 1980, episode of WWF Championship Wrestling, defeating Tony Garea and Rene Goulet in the finals of a tournament. Their second reign lasted until November 8, 1980, when they lost to Garea and Rick Martel. The Wild Samoans left the WWF in December 1980.

New Japan Pro-Wrestling (1981)
In January to February 1981, The Wild Samoans toured Japan with New Japan Pro-Wrestling, performing as "The Samoan #1" (Afa) and "The Samoan #2" (Sika) respectively. They competed in the New Year Golden Series, repeatedly facing Antonio Inoki and Seiji Sakaguchi. The Wild Samoans made a second tour of Japan in November and December 1981, competing in the Madison Square Garden Tag League.

Mid-South Wrestling (1981–1982)
In April 1981, The Wild Samoans debuted in the Oklahoma City, Oklahoma-based promotion Mid-South Wrestling. They were initially managed by Ernie Ladd before betraying him to align themselves with Skandor Akbar. The Wild Samoans held the 
Mid-South Tag Team Championship on three occasions between June 1981 and May 1982, feuding with Junkyard Dog and his partners. They left the promotion in May 1982.

Georgia Championship Wrestling (1982)
In March 1982, The Wild Samoans began competing for the Atlanta, Georgia-based promotion Georgia Championship Wrestling, where they were managed by Sonny King. In August 1982, they defeated The Fabulous Freebirds to win the NWA National Tag Team Championship. They held the championship for several months, vacating it in December 1982 upon leaving the promotion to return to the WWF.

Return to WWF (1983–1985)
The Wild Samoans returned to the WWF in January 1983, once again adopting Lou Albano as their manager. They won the WWF World Tag Team Championship for a third and final time on March 8, 1983, defeating Chief Jay Strongbow and Jules Strongbow. During their reign, Anoa'i sustained an injury, with his nephew Samu substituting for him in several title defences. The Wild Samoans' reign ended on November 15, 1983, when they lost to Soul Patrol (Rocky Johnson and Tony Atlas) after Albano accidentally hit Afa with a chair.

After splitting from Albano, The Wild Samoans challenged Soul Patrol on several occasions but were unable to regain the championship. In April 1984, Anoa'i unsuccessfully challenged Hogan for the WWF Championship in one of Hogan's earliest title defenses. In mid-1984, The Wild Samoans turned face and began a lengthy feud with The North-South Connection (Adrian Adonis and Dick Murdoch). They left the WWF once more in January 1985.

Various promotions (1985-1986)
The Wild Samoans appeared with multiple different promotions in 1985 and 1986, among them the American Wrestling Association, Jim Crockett Promotions, and International Championship Wrestling.

Second return to WWF (1986–1988)
With Afa now semi-retired, Anoa'i returned to the WWF in August 1986 as a singles wrestler. Managed by The Wizard, he spent several weeks undefeated before losing to Pedro Morales in November 1986.

In March 1987, Anoa'i formed a tag team with Kamala, aligning himself with Kamala's manager, Mr. Fuji, and "handler", Kim Chee. The duo wrestled a series of matches against The Can-Am Connection and took part in several tournaments. The team was dissolved in August 1987 when Kamala left the WWF. In September 1987, Anoa'i competed in the King of the Ring tournament, losing in the first round to S. D. Jones. On the October 3, 1987 Saturday Night's Main Event XII (recorded September 23, 1987), Anoa'i unsuccessfully challenged WWF Champion Hulk Hogan in the main event. He went on to wrestle a series of matches against Bam Bam Bigelow and then against Jake Roberts. At the Slammy Awards ceremony on December 16, 1987, the "Song of the Year" category ended with no winner after Anoa'i ate the envelope containing the winner's name.

In early 1988, Anoa'i's regular opponents included Lanny Poffo, George Steele, and Hillbilly Jim. On March 27, 1988, he appeared on his first pay-per-view, competing in a battle royal at WrestleMania IV. Anoa'i left the WWF once more following the bout.

Late career (1988)
After leaving the WWF, Anoa'i wrestled a handful of matches on the independent circuit. He formed a short-lived tag team with his nephew Kokina in Continental Wrestling Federation, where they were managed by Alan Martin. He retired later that year.

Retirement (1988–present)
Following his retirement, Anoa'i remained active in wrestling. He trained wrestlers at the Wild Samoan Training Center, a professional wrestling school run by Afa in Minneola, Florida. In 1999, he founded XW 2000, an independent wrestling promotion based in Pensacola, Florida.

On March 31, 2007, The Wild Samoans were inducted into the WWE Hall of Fame by Sika's son Matt and Afa's son Samu.

The Wild Samoans appeared at Hell in a Cell (2020) to celebrate Roman Reigns' victory.

Personal life
Anoa'i is married to Patricia Hooker but they are currently separated. The couple have five children, two boys, Matthew and Leati Joseph, both of whom also became professional wrestlers. Matthew, who was best known for competing for WWE as "Rosey", died on April 17, 2017. Leati Joseph played college football for Georgia Tech from 2003 to 2006 before beginning a professional wrestling career in 2010, ultimately joining WWE as "Roman Reigns" and winning the WWE Championship on multiple occasions.

Championships and accomplishments
Big Time Wrestling
NWA World Tag Team Championship (Detroit version) (2 times) – with Afa
Cauliflower Alley Club
Other honoree (1997)
Continental Wrestling Association
AWA Southern Tag Team Championship (1 time) – with Afa
Georgia Championship Wrestling
NWA National Tag Team Championship (1 time) – with Afa
Gulf Coast Championship Wrestling
NWA Gulf Coast Tag Team Championship (2 times) – with Afa
International Wrestling Alliance
IWA Tag Team Championship (1 time) – with Afa
Mid-South Wrestling
Mid-South Tag Team Championship (3 times) – with Afa
NWA All-Star Wrestling
NWA Canadian Tag Team Championship (Vancouver version) (1 time) – with Afa
NWA Mid-America
NWA United States Tag Team Championship (Mid-America version) (1 time) – with Afa
Pro Wrestling Illustrated
PWI ranked him # 462 of the 500 best singles wrestlers of the "PWI Years" in 2003
PWI ranked him # 93 of the 100 best tag teams of the "PWI Years" with Afa in 2003
Professional Wrestling Hall of Fame
Class of 2012 – with Afa
Stampede Wrestling
Stampede International Tag Team Championship (2 times) – with Afa
World Wrestling Council
WWC North American Tag Team Championship (1 time) – with Afa
World Wrestling Entertainment/World Wrestling Federation
WWE Hall of Fame (Class of 2007)
WWF World Tag Team Championship (3 times)

See also 
 Anoa'i family
 The Wild Samoans

References

External links
 
 
 

1945 births
American Samoan male professional wrestlers
Anoa'i family
Living people
Professional wrestling trainers
Professional Wrestling Hall of Fame and Museum
United States Merchant Mariners
WWE Hall of Fame inductees
Stampede Wrestling alumni
Stampede Wrestling International Tag Team Champions
NWA National Tag Team Champions